The 2015 World of Outlaws Sprint Car Series season was the 37th season of the winged sprint car series in North America. The season began with the DIRTcar Nationals at Volusia Speedway Park on February 13, and ended with the Bad Boy Buggies World of Outlaws World Finals at The Dirt Track at Charlotte on November 8. Donny Schatz entered the season as the defending series champion, and clinched the 2015 championship, his seventh overall, after a second-place finish in the  National Open at Williams Grove Speedway on October 4.

Full-time teams and drivers

Schedule and results

 ≠ indicates the race was canceled
 ≈ indicates the race was a non-points event

Schedule notes and changes
 April 24 race at Devil's Bowl Speedway was canceled due to weather conditions.
 Night 2 of the Morgan Cup (May 16) at Williams Grove Speedway was canceled due to weather conditions.
 May 25 race at Lawrenceburg Speedway was postponed due to weather conditions. The race was rescheduled for October 16.
 NAPA Auto Parts Rumble in Michigan (May 30) at I-96 Speedway was postponed due to weather conditions. The race was rescheduled for June 24.
 O'Reilly Auto Parts presents the Outlaws at Lakeside (June 6) at Lakeside Speedway was postponed due to weather conditions. The race was rescheduled for July 1.
 June 26 race at 34 Raceway was canceled due to weather conditions.
 Brad Doty Classic (July 16) at Limaland Motorsports Park was canceled due to weather conditions.
 July 31 race at Brockville Ontario Speedway was canceled due to weather conditions.
 August 1 race at Autodrome Drummond was canceled due to weather conditions.
 Night 1 of the Monster Meltdown (September 5) at Skagit Speedway was canceled due to weather conditions.
 The Arnold Motor Supply Shootout (September 18) at Clay County Fairgrounds was canceled due to weather conditions.
 Nights 1 and 2 of the National Open (October 1 & October 2) at Williams Grove Speedway were canceled due to weather conditions.
 Night 3 of the National Open (October 3) at Williams Grove Speedway was postponed due to weather conditions. The race was rescheduled for October 4.
 October 25 race at Weedsport Speedway was canceled due to weather conditions.
 Night 3 of the Bad Boy Buggies World of Outlaws World Finals at The Dirt Track at Charlotte was postponed due to weather conditions. The race was rescheduled for November 8.

Championship Standings

Driver Standings

Team Standings

References

World of Outlaws Sprint Car seasons
World of Outlaws Sprint Car Series
World of Outlaws Sprint Car Series